Charles Danso Otu (born 25 December 1998) is a Ghanaian professional footballer who plays as a midfielder for Ghanaian Premier League side Accra Great Olympics.

Career

Early career 
Otu played for Ghana Division One League side Asokwa Deportivo SC before joining Teshie based-side Accra Great Olympics.

Great Olympics 
In April 2020, Asokwa Deportivo confirmed that two of their players, Otu and Ebenezer Sekyere had joined Accra Great Olympics after successful negotiation between the two parties. He signed a two-year contract with the club and was named in the club's squad list for the 2020–21 Ghana Premier League season. On 17 December 2020, he made his debut in a 1–0 win against Kumasi Asante Kotoko, coming on in the 90th minute for Michel Otou to make a cameo appearance. He scored his first goal from an assist by Gladson Awako on 24 December 2020 in a 1–1 draw against Cape Coast Ebusua Dwarfs. On 2 February 2021, he scored the first goal from an assist by Abdul Manaf Mudasiru in a 3–1 victory over King Faisal Babes, to help the Dade Boys move to the top of the league as joint leaders with 21 points along with Karela United after match day 12.

References

External links 

 

Living people
1998 births
Association football midfielders
Ghanaian footballers
Accra Great Olympics F.C. players
Ghana Premier League players